Józef Tretiak (28 September 1841 – 18 March 1923) was a Polish writer. 

Tretiak wrote a major critical biography of Józef Bohdan Zaleski (3 vols, 1911, 1913, 1914).

References

External links
 

1841 births
1923 deaths
Polish male writers